David Hugh Browne  is an Ulster unionist politician from Northern Ireland.

Life
Browne was elected to Belfast City Council for the Ulster Unionist Party (UUP) in the Castle electoral area at the 1993 elections. He was then elected to the Northern Ireland Forum in Belfast North in 1996, but was unsuccessful when he stood for the same seat at the 1998 Northern Ireland Assembly election.

Browne continued to hold his council seat for over 25 years, along with a variety of other civic posts.  He was appointed as High Sheriff of Belfast in 2005 and, in 2008, he was elected as Deputy Lord Mayor of Belfast. At the 2011 local elections, the UUP were reduced to three seats on the council, one of which was held by Browne, who was subsequently appointed as an alderman.  In 2012, he was appointed as a Belfast Harbour Commissioner. He was reappointed as an Alderman in 2015.  As of 2017, he was also on the Duncairn Community Centre Committee, the North Belfast Partnership Board and the Northern Ireland Rural Development Programme.

Browne lost his City Council seat in 2019.

Honours
Browne was awarded an MBE in the Queen’s Birthday Honours List of June 2013, cited for "services to Local Government in Northern Ireland."

Personal life
Browne lived in the Skegoneill area of Belfast at the time of his first Council election and still as of 2017.

References

Year of birth missing (living people)
Politicians from Belfast
Ulster Unionist Party councillors
Members of Belfast City Council
Members of the Northern Ireland Forum
High Sheriffs of Belfast
Members of the Order of the British Empire
Living people